ZKA is the abbreviation of
 Zentraler Kreditausschuss
 Zollkriminalamt
zanshin karate academy